Calixto Pérez (born October 10, 1949) is a retired boxer from Colombia, who won a silver medal at the 1971 Pan American Games. At the 1972 Olympics he was eliminated in the flyweight quarterfinals by the eventual gold medalist Georgi Kostadinov.

In 1973 Pérez turned professional, and retired in 1978 after 19 bouts.

References

1949 births
Living people
Olympic boxers of Colombia
Boxers at the 1972 Summer Olympics
Sportspeople from Cartagena, Colombia
Colombian male boxers
Boxers at the 1971 Pan American Games
Pan American Games silver medalists for Colombia
Pan American Games medalists in boxing
Bantamweight boxers
Medalists at the 1971 Pan American Games
20th-century Colombian people